Thongak Lairembi, also known as Langol Lairemma, is a primordial goddess in Meitei mythology and religion. She is the divine female personification of the death. She guards the door of the entrance to the underworld, which is the land of the death, ruled by her consort, Thongalen. 
Legend says she gets departed from her husband when Thongalel was lost in the battle between the gods of the underworld and those of the upper world, in the hands of Salailen Sidaba. The winner asked the goddess, who is the wife of the loser, to be the gatekeeper of the entrance gate to the underworld, and for Thongalel, he gave him Khamnung Kikoi Louonbi, in return.

Etymology 

The name "Thongak Lairembi" (/tʰóŋ.ŋak.pə. lai.rem.bi/) is made up of two Meitei language (Manipuri language) words, "Thongak" (ꯊꯣꯡꯉꯥꯛ, /tʰóŋ.ŋak./) and "Lairembi" (ꯂꯥꯢꯔꯦꯝꯕꯤ, /lai.rem.bi/). "Thongak" (adjectival form of noun word "Thongngakpa", /tʰóŋ.ŋak.pə/) means doorkeeper or gatekeeper in Meitei language (Manipuri language). "Lairembi" (ꯂꯥꯢꯔꯦꯝꯕꯤ, /lai.rem.bi/) means goddess or a female divinity in Meitei language (Manipuri language).

Festival 
Every year, the Lai Haraoba festival is celebrated in honor of goddess Thongak Lairembi.

See also 
 Thongalel
 Laikhurembi
 Khamnung Kikoi Louonbi

References

External links 

 A Critical Study Of The Religious Philosophy
 Maram Nagas, a Socio-cultural Study - Page 41 - Joseph Athickal · 1992
 Human Exploitation and Biodiversity Conservation - Page 109 - David L. Hawksworth, Alan T. Bull · 2008
 Frontline - Volume 11, Issues 16-20 - Page 32 - 1994

Arts deities
Arts goddesses
Beauty deities
Beauty goddesses
Death deities
Death goddesses
Fortune deities
Fortune goddesses
Justice deities
Justice goddesses
Leima
Life-death-rebirth deities
Life-death-rebirth goddesses
Liminal deities
Liminal goddesses
Love and lust deities
Love and lust goddesses
Magic deities
Magic goddesses
Maintenance deities
Maintenance goddesses
Meitei deities
Names of God in Sanamahism
Nature deities
Nature goddesses
Peace deities
Peace goddesses
Savior deities
Savior goddesses
Time and fate deities
Time and fate goddesses
Underworld deities
Underworld goddesses